The Eagle and Phenix Dam was a stone dam on the Chattahoochee River, in downtown Columbus, Georgia. The dam was built in 1882 to power the Eagle and Phenix Textile Mill. It was located just south of the 13th Street Bridge connecting Columbus to Phenix City, Alabama.

The Eagle and Phenix Dam site is now owned by the City of Columbus. The dam was breached during March 2012 in order to restore natural flowing conditions. This was to create an urban whitewater park along the river.

References

External links
Historic American Engineering Record (HAER) documentation, filed under Columbus, Muscogee County, GA:

DEagle and Phenix
Buildings and structures in Columbus, Georgia
Buildings and structures in Muscogee County, Georgia
Buildings and structures in Russell County, Alabama
Dams completed in 1882
Dams in Alabama
Dams in Georgia (U.S. state)
Historic American Engineering Record in Georgia (U.S. state)